Events in the year 1917 in Mexico.

Incumbents

Federal government 
 President-Venustiano Carranza

Governors
 Aguascalientes: Aurelio L. González
 Campeche: Joaquín Mucel Acereto
 Chiapas: Manuel Fuentes A./Pablo Villanueva
 Chihuahua: Arnulfo González
 Coahuila: Gustavo Espinoza Mireles
 Colima: Interim Governors
 Durango:  
 Guanajuato: Agustín Alcocer
 Guerrero: Francisco Figueroa Mata
 Hidalgo: 
 Jalisco: Emiliano Degollado/Manuel Bouquet, Jr.
 State of Mexico: Agustín Millán Vivero/Joaquín García Luna
 Michoacán: 
 Morelos: 
 Nayarit: José Santos Godínez
 Nuevo León: Nicéforo Zambrano
 Oaxaca: Juan Jiménez Méndez
 Puebla: Alfonso Cabrera Lobato
 Querétaro: Ernesto Perrusquía
 San Luis Potosí: Juan G. Barragán Rodríguez 
 Sinaloa: Ramón F. Iturbe
 Sonora: Plutarco Elías Calles
 Tabasco: Joaquín Ruiz/Luis Hernández Hermosillo/Heriberto Jara Corona
 Tamaulipas: Alfredo Ricaut/Andrés Osuna
 Tlaxcala:  
 Veracruz: Cándido Aguilar Vargas
 Yucatán: Salvador Alvarado Rubio
 Zacatecas:

Events
 January 28 – The United States ends its search for Pancho Villa.
 February 5 – The new and current constitution is adopted.
 February 24 – WWI: United States ambassador to the United Kingdom, Walter H. Page, is shown the intercepted Zimmermann Telegram, in which Germany offers to give the American Southwest back to Mexico if Mexico declares war on the United States.
 March 11 – Venustiano Carranza is elected president of Mexico; the United States gives de jure recognition of his government.
 December 25 – Brite Ranch Raid

Notable births
 February 28 – Ernesto Alonso, Mexican actor, director, cinematographer, and producer (died 2007)
 May 16 – Juan Rulfo, Mexican writer (died 1986)
August 13 – Rafael Moreno Valle, military physician, politician (PRI), Governor of Puebla (1969-1974) (d. 2016).
 November 18 – Pedro Infante, Mexican actor and singer (died 1957)

Notable deaths
May 18 — Otilio Montaño Sánchez was a Zapatista general during the Mexican Revolution (b. 1887)
June 18 — Eufemio Zapata was a member of the Zapatistas during the Mexican Revolution (b. 1873)
August 9 – José Inés Salazar

References

External links

 
Years of the 20th century in Mexico
Mexico